The 1981 Inner Mongolia student protest, which took place in Inner Mongolia from 22 August to 15 November 1981, opposed a package of new policies that would worsen steppe degradation in the Inner Mongolia steppe and worsen the political representation of Chinese Mongols. The protest were mostly organized by the students of Inner Mongolia University. The policies were proposed by then Inner Mongolia Chief party secretary Zhou Hui and sanctioned by the Secretariat of the Chinese Communist Party at its meeting on 16 July 1981, chaired by then top party secretary Hu Yaobang.

Hu, known for his restraint approach towards students, ordered Zhou Hui to not arrest any students. As promised, the students were left unscathed, but many bureaucrats, school headmasters and teachers were demoted.

See also
1989 Tiananmen Square protests, also handled by Hu Yaobang
2020 Inner Mongolia protest, on bilingual education policy
Rural-to-urban migration in China
steppe degradation
Ethnic issues in China

References

1981 in China
History of Inner Mongolia
Language policy in Inner Mongolia